Howrah Madhya Assembly constituency is an assembly constituency in Howrah district in the Indian state of West Bengal.

Overview
As per orders of the Delimitation Commission, No. 171 Howrah Madhya Assembly constituency is composed of the following: Ward Nos. 17 to 20, 24 to 34, 36, 37 and 42 of Howrah Municipal Corporation.

Howrah Madhya Assembly constituency is part of No. 25  Howrah (Lok Sabha constituency).

Members of Legislative Assembly

Election results

2021

2016

2011
In the 2011 election, Aroop Roy (Apu) of Trinamool Congress defeated his nearest rival Arup Ray(Tukun)of CPI(M). 

 

.# Swing calculated on Congress+Trinamool Congress vote percentages taken together in 2006.

1977-2006
In the 2006 state assembly elections Arup Ray of CPI(M) won the Howrah Central assembly seat defeating his nearest rival Ambica Banerjee of Trinamool Congress. Contests in most years were multi cornered but only winners and runners are being mentioned. In 2001, 1996, 1991, 1987 and 1982 state assembly elections, Ambica Banerjee of Trinamool Congress/ Congress defeated Subir Ranjan Das of CPI(M) in 2001, Sureswar Dutta of Janata Dal in 1996 and 1991, Sankar Mondol, Independent, in 1987, and Sudhindranath Kumar in 1982. Sudhindranath Kumar, Revolutionary Communist Party of India, defeated Sukumar Banerjee of Janata Party in 1977.

1967-1972
Mrityunjoy Banerjee of Congress won in 1972. Sudhindranath Kumar of RCPI won in 1971, Anadi Das of RCPI won in 1969. D.Mitra of Congress won in 1967.

1951-1962
During the period Howrah had four Vidhan Sabha constituencies.

Howrah North
Saila Mukherjee of Congress won in 1962. Samar Mukhopadhyay of CPI won in 1957. Biren Banerjee of CPI won in 1951.

Howrah West
Anadi Dass, Independent, won in 1962. Bankim Chandra Kar of Congress won in 1957 and 1951.

Howrah East
Bejoy Bhattacharyya of Congress won in 1962. Beni Chandra Dutta of Congress won in 1957. Saila Kumar Mukhopdhyay of Congress won in 1951.

For results of Howrah South constituency see Howrah Dakshin Assembly constituency

References

Assembly constituencies of West Bengal
Politics of Howrah district
1952 establishments in West Bengal
Constituencies established in 1952